Atlántico Diario is a Spanish language daily newspaper for the Vigo metropolitan area of Galicia in Spain.

References

External links
 Official website

1987 establishments in Spain
Daily newspapers published in Spain
Mass media in Vigo
Newspapers established in 1987
Spanish-language newspapers